Staré Město is a municipality and village in Svitavy District in the Pardubice Region of the Czech Republic. It has about 1,000 inhabitants.

Administrative parts
Villages of Bílá Studně, Petrušov and Radišov are administrative parts of Staré Město.

References

Villages in Svitavy District